The 1988–1989 season was the 110th season in Bolton Wanderers F.C.'s existence, and their first season back in the Football League Third Division following promotion from the Football League Fourth Division. It covers the period from 1 July 1988 to 30 June 1989.

Results

Football League Division Three

FA Cup

Littlewoods Cup

Sherpa Van Trophy

Top scorers

Notes

References

Bolton Wanderers
Bolton Wanderers F.C. seasons